Only one of the five South Carolina incumbents were re-elected.

Electoral data are only available for the 1st and 5th district of South Carolina's 6 districts at the time of the elections of 1794.

References

See also 
 List of United States representatives from South Carolina
 United States House of Representatives elections, 1794 and 1795

1794
South Carolina
United States House of Representatives